Polycomb group RING finger protein 2, PCGF2, also known as MEL18 or RNF110, is a protein that in humans is encoded by the PCGF2 gene.

Function 

The protein encoded by this gene contains a RING finger motif. PCGF2 is a component of the canonical PRC1 complex composed of RING1A/B,  CBX2/CBX4, polyhomeotic (PHC) proteins and is very similar to the PCGF4/BMI1 containing PRC1. Canonical PRC1 binds to chromatin via the chromodomain of the CBX subunit that recognizes the H3K27me3 mark deposited by PRC2. Canonical PRC1 complexes have been shown to compact chromatin and mediate higher-order chromatin structures.

Polycomb complexes maintain the transcription repression of genes involved in embryogenesis, cell cycles, and tumorigenesis. PCGF2 was shown to act as a negative regulator of transcription and has tumor suppressor activity. The expression of this gene was detected in various tumor cells, but is limited in neural organs in normal tissues. Knockout studies in mice suggested that this protein may negatively regulate the expression of different cytokines, chemokines, and chemokine receptors, and thus plays an important role in lymphocyte differentiation and migration, as well as in immune responses.

References

Further reading